Elena Hight (born August 17, 1989, in Kauai) is an American Olympic snowboarder.

In May 2012, while training with the U.S. snowboard team in Mammoth, California, Hight became the first snowboarder to land a double backside alley-oop rodeo in halfpipe competition.

On January 26, 2013, at Winter X Games XVII, Hight became the first snowboarder to land a double backside alley-oop rodeo during a halfpipe competition.

Athletic achievements 

 Two-time Olympian
 X Games Gold Medalist
 Seven-time X Games Medalist
 Burton US Open Champion
 First female to land a frontside 900 in competition at 13 years old
 First snowboarder to land a double backside alley-oop rodeo in a halfpipe contest at the 2013 Winter X Games
 Featured in the 2013 ESPN Magazine Body Issue
 Oxygen Magazine's February 2014 Cover Girl
 Included in the coveted all women's feature film Full Moon
 First Women to pursue a wholly human powered project with snowboarding Icon Jeremy Jones
 Experience Magazine's November 2018 Cover Girl
 Explored alongside Jeremy Jones for feature film Ode To Muir
 First female to ride the infamous Tahoe Grizzly Spines

References

 ESPN Body Issue 
 Oxygen Magazine
 B4BC Cookbook collaboration
 Women's Sports Foundation partnership

External links
 
 
 
 
 
 

1989 births
American female snowboarders
Living people
Olympic snowboarders of the United States
Snowboarders at the 2006 Winter Olympics
Snowboarders at the 2010 Winter Olympics
Sportspeople from Hawaii
People from Kauai County, Hawaii
Sportspeople from California
X Games athletes
People from South Lake Tahoe, California
21st-century American women